Poliovirus receptor related immunoglobulin domain containing is a protein that in humans is encoded by the PVRIG gene.

References

Further reading